Illya Rylinski (born 16 February 1984) is a retired Belarusian professional footballer.

External links
Profile at teams.by

1984 births
Living people
Belarusian footballers
Association football midfielders
FC RUOR Minsk players
FC Dinamo-Juni Minsk players
FC Veras Nesvizh players
FC Darida Minsk Raion players
FC Gomel players
FC Volna Pinsk players
FC Smorgon players